Adam Buksa (born 12 July 1996) is a Polish professional footballer who plays as a centre forward for Ligue 1 club Lens and the Poland national team. Besides Poland, he has played in Italy, United States and France. He is the older brother of Aleksander Buksa.

Club career

Clubs in Poland 
Adam Buksa is a product of the club's youth system of Wisła Kraków, but started his professional career in Lechia Gdańsk and made his debut on 25 July 2014 against Podbeskidzie Bielsko-Biała. He played for Lechia for two seasons and moved to Zagłębie Lubin after the 2015–16 season.

In Zagłębie, Buksa played until January 2018 and was loaned out to Pogoń Szczecin for the remainder of the 2017–18 season. After the season, Buksa signed a contract with Pogoń and established himself as one of the most promising young strikers in Poland. In December 2019, he signed a contract for three years with New England Revolution from Major League Soccer.

New England Revolution
Buksa signed for the New England Revolution on 12 December 2019. His reported transfer fee of $4.5 million made him the second-most expensive signing in the franchises' history behind Gustavo Bou. He became the third Polish-born player to represent the Revolution, joining Rob Jachym (1997–98) and Janusz Michallik (1998). Buksa made his first appearance for the team in the season opener, a 2–1 loss to Montreal Impact on 29 February 2020. He scored his first goal for the Revolution in the 28th minute the franchises' home opener against the Chicago Fire on 7 March 2020, assisted by Brandon Bye. It was the first goal scored by a first-year Revolution player in a home opener since Saër Sène in 2012 against the Portland Timbers.

Buksa finished second in regular-season scoring for the Revolution in his inaugural campaign, with six goals and two assists in 23 appearances.

On 24 November 2020, in the 26th minute of the first round of the 2020 MLS Cup Playoffs, Buksa scored the game-winning goal in the Revolutions' 2–0 victory over the 1st-seeded, Supporter's Shield holders, the Philadelphia Union.

Buksa scored the first goal of the Revolution's 2021 season in the franchises' season-opener against the Chicago Fire at Soldier Field on 17 April 2021  He would lead the Revolution to their first MLS Supporter's Shield, finishing the 2021 season as the Revolution's top goal scorer. He would conclude the 2021 season tied for 5th in the league in goals scored with 16 in 31 appearances. He would score the club's opening goal in the 2021 MLS Playoffs against eventual-champion NYCFC. Buksa's penalty would later be saved by Sean Johnson as the Revolution ultimately fell 3-2 in penalties following a 2-2 draw in open play.

Buksa started the 2022 season strongly, scoring 7 goals in his first 10 matches for the club. His start to the season included a 7 game scoring streak, which tied a team record set by Wolde Harris in 2000. On 29 May 2022 Seth Macomber of the Bent Musket reported that Buksa, who had missed the Revolution's past two matches and had been released to Poland for national team duty, was close to joining Lens on a permanent deal. On 6 June 2022. The Boston Globe's Frank Dell'Apa reported that the Revolution had indeed agreed to transfer Buksa to Lens in return for a transfer fee of $10 million, believed to be a record fee paid for a player by the French club. Buksa finished his Revolution career 11th on the all-time list of goal scorers for the club, with 35 goals in 73 games.

Lens
On 7 June 2022, New England Revolution announced that Buksa would be leaving the club and would be transferring to Ligue 1 club Lens for a reported transfer fee of $10 million. He joined Lens on 10 July 2022. He made his first appearance in Ligue 1 on 9 September 2022 against Troyes.

International career
Buksa received first call-up to the Poland national team by then-manager Jerzy Brzęczek in a friendly against the Czech Republic on 15 November 2018, but was unused in Poland's 1–0 defeat. He was also an unused reserve in Poland's 1–1 away draw to Portugal in the 2018–19 UEFA Nations League A, where Poland finished bottom but later spared from relegation due to UEFA's revising the format.

After three years hiatus, Buksa finally made his debut for the national team against Albania as a starter in the 2022 FIFA World Cup qualification, he also contributed one goal in the match where Poland achieved a 4–1 home win over the Balkan opponents.

On just his second appearance with the national team, Buksa completed his first-ever hat trick as Poland went on to win against San Marino 7–1.

Career statistics

Club

International

Scores and results list Poland's goal tally first, score column indicates score after each Buksa goal.

Honours
New England Revolution
Supporters' Shield: 2021

References

External links
 
 
 

1996 births
Living people
Polish footballers
Footballers from Kraków
Association football forwards
Poland international footballers
Poland youth international footballers
Poland under-21 international footballers
Wisła Kraków players
Hutnik Nowa Huta players
Garbarnia Kraków players
Novara F.C. players
Lechia Gdańsk players
Lechia Gdańsk II players
Zagłębie Lubin players
Pogoń Szczecin players
New England Revolution players
RC Lens players
III liga players
Ekstraklasa players
Major League Soccer players
Designated Players (MLS)
Ligue 1 players
Polish expatriate footballers
Expatriate footballers in Italy
Polish expatriate sportspeople in Italy
Expatriate soccer players in the United States
Polish expatriate sportspeople in the United States
Expatriate footballers in France
Polish expatriate sportspeople in France